William Shareston (died 1621) of Bath, Somerset, was an English politician.

He was a Member (MP) of the Parliament of England for Bath in 1584, 1586, 1593, 1597, 1601 and 1604. He was Mayor of Bath in 1581–82, 1585, 1585–86, 1590–91, 1593–94, 1599–?1600 and 1607–08.

References

Year of birth missing
1621 deaths
Mayors of Bath, Somerset
English MPs 1584–1585
English MPs 1586–1587
English MPs 1593
English MPs 1597–1598
English MPs 1601
English MPs 1604–1611